Events in the history of Verona, in Italy.

Pre-Roman Verona
The origins of Verona are unclear. 
According to some theories it was a city of the Euganei, who were obliged to cede the city to the Cenomani circa 550 BC. 
Other scholars link its foundation to the presence of the Arusnates in the area, a people of uncertain origins, perhaps taped to the Etruscans: the name would have meant "Venetian city on the river" in the Etruscan language. 
Pliny the Elder attributed the foundation of Verona to the Raetians instead.
The relationship between Verona and Ancient Rome was usually one of friendship or alliance. In the 1st century BC the citizens fought alongside the Romans against the Teutones and Cimbri invaders. The city derived importance from possessing the main ford in the area, situated on the Adige river.

Roman Verona
Verona became a Roman colony in the year 89 BCE, receiving the franchise in 59 and became a municipium in 49 BCE. The former ford was replaced by two bridges, one of which, the Pothumius Bridge, also functioned as an aqueduct, as well as a dam for setting naval battles in the Theater. The city also had a forum, not far from the current Piazza delle Erbe and, outside the walls, the famous Arena. Its strategic importance lay in its position at the junction of four main roads: the Via Gallica, from Turin to Aquileia; the Via Claudia Augusta, from Modena to Germany; the Via Postumia, from Liguria to Illyria; and the Vicum Veronensis, which connected the city to Ostiglia.

Due to its leading position in northern Italy, Verona was often involved in civil Roman wars. Famous figures who fought here include Vespasian and Vitellius (CE 69); Philip the Arab and Decius (249); Carinus and Sabinus Julianus (283); and Constantine the Great, who defeated Ruricius Pompeianus here after a long siege in 312. The city was also the residence of emperors on a frequent basis. In 265 the emperor Gallienus, to improve safety, extended the walls to include the Arena.

In the 1st centuries CE, Verona slowly converted to Christianity; sometimes the beliefs of its citizenry aligned closely with unorthodox theories such as those of Arius or Fotinus. Under Bishop St. Zeno, the orthodox doctrine was definitively imposed.  (see Ecclesiastical history of Verona)

Early middle ages
In 403 the king of the Visigoths, Alaric I, invaded northern Italy from Dalmatia.  After setting himself up in Verona, he was defeated by the Roman general Stilicho. In 452 the Hun confederation leader Attila was stopped, after a series of ravages, not far from Verona by an imperial embassy led by Pope Leo I.

After the definitive fall of the Western Roman Empire in 476, Verona was one of the strongholds of Odoacer, whose government was well entrenched in the city. At Verona, Odoacer implemented his last stand against the Ostrogoth army sent against him by the Eastern emperor, which was led by Theodoric the Great.

With the taking of Verona in 489, the Gothic domination of Italy began; Theodoric built one of his palaces in the city: another was in Ravenna. In Germanic legends the name of Verona is linked with that of Theodoric, in German Dietrich von Bern. The city remained in the hands of the Goths all through the Gothic War, with the exception of a single day in 541 when an Armenian officer effected an entrance. The Goths were able to regain possession of the city, due to disagreements which arose among the Byzantine generals with respect to booty. In 552 the Byzantine general Valerian vainly endeavoured to gain an entrance, and only the complete overthrow of the Goths brought about the city's surrender.

In 569 it was taken by Alboin, King of the Lombards. Verona became, for all intents and purposes, the second-most important city of his kingdom. Alboin was killed by his own wife at Verona in 572.

The dukes of Treviso often resided there. At Verona in 774, Adalgisus, son of Desiderius, made his last desperate stand against Charlemagne, who had destroyed the Lombard kingdom.
Verona was then the ordinary residence of the kings of Italy. The government of the city became hereditary in the family of Count Milo, progenitor of the counts of San Bonifacio. From 880 to 951 the two Berengarii resided there: Berengar II made the city the seat of a frontier March, which replaced the March of Friuli. At various times, the March of Verona was under the control of the Duchy of Carinthia and at other times not. From 951 to 975, both Carinthia and Verona were under the control of the Duchy of Bavaria.

The 983 royal election was held in Verona.

High middle ages
Medieval Verona was dominated by its forty-eight towers. The increasing wealth of the burgher families eclipsed the power of the counts, and in 1135 Verona was organised as a free commune. The San Bonifacio could at most hold the office of podestà of the city now.  In 1164 Verona joined with Vicenza, Padua and Treviso to create the Veronese League, which was integrated with the Lombard League in 1167 to battle against the emperor Frederick I Barbarossa.  Victory was achieved at the Battle of Legnano in 1176, and the Treaty of Venice signed in 1177 followed by the  Peace of Constance in 1183. This, however, gave rise to the factions of Guelphs and Ghibellines in Verona. In 1221 the famous Guelph Rambertino Buvalelli was elected podestà but died within months. When Ezzelino III da Romano was elected podestà, in 1226, he was able to convert the office into a permanent lordship, and in 1257 he caused the slaughter of 11,000 Paduans on the plain of Verona (Campi di Verona). Upon his death the Great Council elected as podestà Mastino I della Scala, and he converted the "signoria" into a family possession, though leaving the burghers a share in the government. Failing to be re-elected podestà in 1262, he effected a coup d'état, and was acclaimed capitano del popolo, with the command of the communal troops. The rule of his family over Verona and mainland Veneto would last 125 years and come to be know as that of the Scaliger. By means of internal discord, Mastino succeeded in establishing the new office, to which was attached the function of confirming the podestà. In 1277, Mastino dello Scala was killed by the faction of the nobles.

The reign of the son of Mastino, Alberto, as capitano (1277–1302) was one incessant war against the counts of San Bonifacio, who were aided by the House of Este. Of his sons, Bartolomeo, Alboino and Cangrande I, only the last shared the government (1308); he was great as warrior, prince, and patron of the arts; he protected Dante, Petrarch, and Giotto. By war or treaty he brought under his control the cities of Padua (1328), Treviso (1308), and Vicenza.

Cangrande was succeeded by Mastino II (1329–51) and Alberto II, sons of Alboino. Mastino continued his uncle's policy, conquering Brescia in 1332 and carrying his power beyond the Po. He purchased Parma (1335) and Lucca (1339). After the King of France, he was the richest prince of his time. But a powerful league was formed against him in 1337 — Florence, Venice, the Visconti, the Este, and the Gonzaga. After a three years war, the Scaliger dominions were reduced to Verona and Vicenza. His son Cangrande II (1351–1359) was a cruel, dissolute, and suspicious tyrant; not trusting his own subjects, he surrounded himself with Brandenburg mercenaries. He was killed by his brother Cansignorio (1359–1375), who beautified the city with palaces, provided it with aqueducts and bridges, and founded the state treasury. He also killed his other brother, Paolo Alboino. Fratricide seems to have become a family custom, for Antonio (1375–1387), Cansignorio's natural brother, slew his brother Bartolomeo, thereby arousing the indignation of the people, who deserted him when Gian Galeazzo Visconti of Milan made war on him. Having exhausted all his resources and having been defeated at the Battle of Castagnaro, he fled from Verona at midnight (19 October 1387), thus putting an end to the Scaliger domination, which, however, survived in its monuments.

Antonio's son Can Francesco attempted in vain to recover Verona (1390).

Verona was ruled by the Carraresi of Padua from 1402. Guglielmo (1404), natural son of Cangrande II, drove out them with the support of the people, but died ten days after. Verona therefore submitted to Venice (1405). The last representatives of the Scaligeri lived at the imperial court and repeatedly attempted to recover Verona by the aid of popular risings.

Renaissance
From 1490 to 1516, the city was in the power of the Emperor Maximilian I, who aimed to make it the capital of the renewed German kingdom in northern Italy. In that period Verona also suffered for a plague (1511–1512), which killed 13,000 inhabitants. With the treaty of Brussels (December 1516), Maximilian gave the city to his grandson Charles V of Spain, who in turn ceded it to France. The latter finally gave it back to Venice, who started a program of fortifications that made Verona their main stronghold on the mainland, its garrison including half of their troops.

The peace led to a period of economic, cultural and artistic splendour for Verona. The city was embellished by a great number of palaces, churches and convents, many designed by the architect Michele Sanmicheli. The population rose to 55,000 by 1626, but another plague in 1630 reduced it again to some 20,000.

18th century
In 1776 a method of bellringing called the Veronese bellringing art was developed .
Verona was occupied by Napoleon in 1797, but on Easter Monday – in the Veronese Easters – the populace rose and drove out the French. It was then that Napoleon put an end to the Venetian Republic. Verona became Austrian territory when Napoleon signed the Treaty of Campo Formio on October 12, 1797. The Austrians took control of the city on January 18, 1798.

19th century
It was taken from Austria by the Treaty of Pressburg in 1805 and became part of Napoleon's Kingdom of Italy, but was returned to Austria following Napoleon's defeat in 1814, when it became part of the Austrian-held Kingdom of Lombardy–Venetia.

In 1866, on the anniversary of the defeat of Königgrätz, the Austrians evacuated Verona, their strongest fortress in Venetia, which thus became Italian. In 1882 the city was struck by a large flood, which led to the construction of banks that changed the face of the ancient city, sweeping away the mills and the landing places on the river.

20th century
During World War II Verona was one of the most bombed cities in northeastern Italy, due to its strategic marshalling yard (the target of most raids) and the presence of ministries of the Italian Social Republic. The heaviest raids took place on 28 January, 8 February, 28 March, 6 July and 11 October 1944 and on 4 and 11 January, 23 February and 6 April 1945; industrial districts and districts located near the railway were the ones that suffered the most, but even the city centre suffered significant damage. By the end of the war some 7,000 buildings, or 44 % of the city, had been destroyed or damaged; civilian casualties amounted to 700 deaths.

In April 1945 the fleeing Germans destroyed all the bridges. Verona was awarded a Gold Medal of Military Valor for its support to the partisan war during the conflict.

See also
 Timeline of Verona
Ecclesiastical history of Verona
Verona, Veneto, Lombardy, Italy
Euganei, Cenomani, Rome
History of Italy

References

Further reading

 
 
 
 . (1870 ed.)
 

 
Verona